The velvety manakin (Lepidothrix velutina) is a species of bird in the family Pipridae. It is found from Costa Rica to Ecuador. Its natural habitat is subtropical or tropical moist lowland forest.

The velvety manakin was formerly considered to be conspecific with Lepidothrix coronata and together they were known under the common name "blue-crowned manakin". A study published in 2022 found that there were significant vocal and phylogenetic differences between the west of Andes taxa and those from the east of the Andes. The velvety manakin was therefore promoted to species status and the "blue-crowned manakin" renamed to the blue-capped manakin.

References

velvety manakin
Birds of Costa Rica
Birds of Panama
Birds of the Tumbes-Chocó-Magdalena
velvety manakin
Taxa named by Hans von Berlepsch